Paulo Renê Gomes dos Santos (born 24 January 1989), simply known as Paulo Renê, is a Brazilian footballer who plays for Luverdense as a forward.

Personal life 
Son of Maria de Lourdes Gomes and Sérgio Antônio dos Santos, he has only a brother, Sergio, who is seven years older. He grew up in an interior city about 40 km from the Federal District. He has been married since 2014 to a Brazilian model, with whom he has two children.

Career statistics

References

External links

1989 births
Living people
Brazilian footballers
Association football forwards
Campeonato Brasileiro Série B players
Campeonato Brasileiro Série C players
Campeonato Brasileiro Série D players
Sociedade Esportiva do Gama players
Associação Botafogo Futebol Clube players
Santa Cruz Futebol Clube players
Clube Atlético Bragantino players
Paraná Clube players
Itumbiara Esporte Clube players
Clube Recreativo e Atlético Catalano players
Madureira Esporte Clube players
Goianésia Esporte Clube players
Luverdense Esporte Clube players